River Rascals is a 2017 Czech comedy film directed by Jiří Chlumský. It was inspired by I Enjoy the World with You.

Plot
Václav and Lad plan an anniversary of their wedding. Their guests include sons David and Igor together with their wives. Nephew Ondřej and his girlfriend Zlatica return from America and are invited too. David, Igor and Ondřej plan to go to the celebration by canoes but wives disagree. When invitement party for Ondřej turns out as a catastrophy, women leave men with children.

2017 Czech legislative election
The Civic Democratic Party used the film during their campaign for the 2017 Czech legislative election. The party organised projections in 90 municipalities across the Czech Republic to attract voters for its meetings. The first projection was held in Mělník on 13 August 2017.

References

External links
 

2017 films
Czech comedy films
2010s Czech-language films
2017 comedy films